Dr. Jürgen-Peter Graf (born December 22, 1952 in Oberkirch (Baden)) is a German lawyer. He became judge of the German Federal Court of Justice (Bundesgerichtshof) on February 5, 2003.

Graf studied law in Freiburg/Breisgau and passed his first legal state examination at the University of Freiburg in 1977, and the second in 1979. From 1980 to 1982 he was assistant lecturer at the University of Freiburg. In 1983 he became a judge in Baden-Wuerttemberg/Germany, then a public-prosecutor and then a judge again. From 1988 to 2003 he was one of the federal prosecutors at the German Generalbundesanwalt in Karlsruhe, and 1994 he became a senior federal prosecutor at the office of the Generalbundesanwalt. In 2003 he was appointed Judge at the Federal Supreme Court of Justice in Karlsruhe.
 
His special interests are the matter of criminal offences on the Internet, new types of crime on the internet like phishing and pharming, the responsibility of Internet providers and the monitoring of telecommunications.

References

1952 births
Living people
People from Oberkirch (Baden)
20th-century German judges
21st-century German judges
Judges of the Federal Court of Justice